IICA may refer to:
Indian Institute of Corporate Affairs
Inter-American Institute for Cooperation on Agriculture
Iranian Institute of Certified Accountants
Israeli Institute of Commercial Arbitration